Nebria crenatostriata is a species of ground beetle in the Nebriinae subfamily that can be found in Italy and Switzerland.

References

Beetles described in 1834
Beetles of Europe